Huanderson Junior da Silva Santos (born 3 August 1983), commonly known as Huanderson, is a Brazilian professional footballer who plays as a goalkeeper for Greek Super League 2 club Karaiskakis. 

Huanderson played for several clubs in his home country, before moving to Europe for Rio Ave.

Career

Brazil
Huanderson started his career for Iraty in 2004. He moved clubs almost annually playing for Guarani, XV de Jaú, Roma Apuracana, Atlético Goianiense, Francana, Araguaína and Goianésia.

Europe
On 8 June 2011 Huanderson signed for Portuguese club Rio Ave. After being benched for the first matches of the season he finally made his debut in a Day 5 match against Leiria. On 25 September 2012 Huanderson signed for Greek Football League outfit Iraklis. He made his debut for the club on 12 November 2012 in a match against Apollon Smyni. After a string of good performances he signed a contract extension with Iraklis until 30 June 2016.
After five years in Iraklis, on 5 September 2017, Apollon Smyrnis officially announced the signing of experienced Brazilian goalkeeper, until the end of 2017-18 season.

Career statistics

Club

References

External links
Player profile in Iraklis F.C. Official website 

1983 births
Living people
Sportspeople from Goiânia
Brazilian footballers
Brazilian expatriate footballers
Association football goalkeepers
Super League Greece players
Iraty Sport Club players
Guarani FC players
Esporte Clube XV de Novembro (Jaú) players
Atlético Clube Goianiense players
Associação Atlética Francana players
Rio Ave F.C. players
Iraklis Thessaloniki F.C. players
Apollon Smyrnis F.C. players
Expatriate footballers in Greece
Araguaína Futebol e Regatas players
A.E. Karaiskakis F.C. players